The 39th Primetime Emmy Awards were held on Sunday, September 20, 1987. The ceremony was broadcast on Fox for the first time, as the network premiered a year earlier from the Pasadena Civic Auditorium in Pasadena, California.

For the second straight year, The Golden Girls won the Primetime Emmy Award for Outstanding Comedy Series. The winner for the Primetime Emmy Award for Outstanding Drama Series was L.A. Law, which, for its first season, won four major awards, and led all shows, with 13 major nominations. The winner for Outstanding Drama/Comedy Special, Promise, set a new record, with five major wins. This record still stands for TV movies, though it was tied by Temple Grandin in 2010. The Tracey Ullman Show received three major nominations on the night, making it the first ceremony in which the network Fox received a major nomination. This was the only time that Hill Street Blues wasn't nominated for Outstanding Drama Series, in its seventh and last season; also, no males actors of Hill Street Blues were nominated (even with 20 previous nominations). Only Betty Thomas for Outstanding Supporting Actress in a Drama Series was nominated, and did not win, making her the only one in the cast to be nominated in all seasons.

NBC continued its dominance of the field, becoming the first network to gain over eighty major nominations (82). Its résumé was highlighted by gaining all five nominations for Outstanding Comedy Series. This had been done only once before (in 1977, but with a field of only four shows), and has not been matched in either field since.

Winners and nominees

Programs

Acting

Lead performances

Supporting performances

Guest performances

Directing

Writing

Most major nominations
By network 
 NBC – 82
 CBS – 36
 ABC – 15

By program
 L.A. Law (NBC) – 13
 The Golden Girls (NBC) / St. Elsewhere (NBC) – 10
 Cheers (NBC) – 8
 Moonlighting (ABC) – 7
 Cagney & Lacey (CBS) / Nutcracker: Money, Madness and Murder (NBC) / Promise (CBS) – 6

Most major awards
By network 
 NBC – 15
 CBS – 9
 ABC – 3

By program
 Promise (CBS) – 5
 L.A. Law (NBC) – 4
 The Golden Girls (NBC) – 3

Notes

References

External links
 Emmys.com list of 1987 Nominees & Winners
 

039
1987 television awards
1987 in California
September 1987 events in the United States